James Washington Lonoikauoalii McGuire (January 21, 1862 – May 16, 1941) was a royal courtier of the Hawaiian Kingdom. He served as a personal attendant and dressmaker to Queen Kapiʻolani, wife of King Kalākaua. McGuire fashioned the peacock feathered dress worn by Queen Kapiolani on the occasion of the Golden Jubilee of Queen Victoria in 1887. He kept a diary of his trip to the jubilee celebrations with the queen and published his account in 1938.

Birth and family 
McGuire was born, on January 21, 1862, at Kainaliu, Kona District, on the island Hawaii. McGuire was of Irish and Native Hawaiian descent. His mother was Mary Kilioe Vanbergen McGuire (1836–1917). His father James Washington McGuire (1831–1911), originally from Baltimore, Maryland, settled in Hawaii after joining the excitement of the California Gold Rush and later became fire marshal and charter member of the Honolulu Volunteer Fire Department.

Royal service 

In April 1887, King Kalākaua sent a delegation to attend the Golden Jubilee of Queen Victoria in London. It included Queen Kapiʻolani, Princess Liliʻuokalani and Liliʻuokalani's husband John Owen Dominis, as well as Court Chamberlain Colonel Curtis P. Iʻaukea acting as official envoy of the king and Colonel James Harbottle Boyd acting as aide-de-camp to the Queen.

McGuire was one of the servants to accompany the royal party as a personal attendant and dressmaker for Queen Kapiʻolani, and held the honorary rank of Special Equerry to the Queen. He fashioned the peacock feathered dress worn by Queen Kapiʻolani on the occasion of the Jubilee, personally collecting the feathers used in the design.

The group landed in San Francisco and traveled across the United States before boarding a ship for the United Kingdom. In London, Kapiʻolani and Liliʻuokalani were granted an audience with Queen Victoria, attending the special Jubilee service at Westminster Abbey  seated with other foreign royal guests and with members of the Royal Household.

In 1938, fifty-one years later, McGuire wrote his moʻolelo (story) of the Hawaiian delegation's journey to the Golden Jubilee from the diary he kept during his travel with the royal party.

In 1889, McGuire also accompanied Kapiʻolani's two nephews Prince Jonah Kūhiō Kalanianaʻole and Prince David Kawānanakoa  on their journey abroad to the United States and Europe.

Death 
McGuire married Hilo-born Fredericke Julia Nolte (1871–1938), and they had two surviving daughters Lani Barringer and Louise Kaanapu.

McGuire worked in various position including as custodian of ʻIolani Palace, a restaurant owner and high bishop of the Church of Jesus Christ of Latter-day Saints in Hawaii. On May 16, 1941, he died at the age of 79 at his home in the Kaimuki neighborhood of Honolulu. In his estate, he left $3,375.54 in cash and a car worth $70. A lifelong collector of Hawaiiana artifacts, he amassed a large collection from his royal patrons. The acquisitions in his estate were valued at $7,532.80 and included seventy calabash bowls, traditional fishing implements, kapa cloth, drums, and kāhili. His funeral was held from the Church of Jesus Christ of Latter-day Saints in Kalihi. He was buried at Oahu Cemetery.

References

Bibliography

Newspapers and online sources

Further reading

External links 
 

1862 births
1941 deaths
Hawaiian Kingdom people
People from Hawaii (island)
Writers from Honolulu
People of Native Hawaiian descent
American people of Irish descent
Native Hawaiian writers